BellaVitano is a cow's milk cheese made by the Sartori Company of Plymouth, Wisconsin. Introduced in 1999, BellaVitano Gold is a hard cheese that is described as having a nutty, fruity flavor and is also available in a number of flavored varieties.

Varieties
BellaVitano Gold is inspired by a traditional Italian farmstead cheese. Starting out like parmesan, it has a creamy, rich texture with light fruity notes and a sweet and tangy finish. The crunch comes from calcium lactate crystals that form as the cheese ages. Gold was named Grand Champion at the 2013 World Dairy Expo.
Balsamic BellaVitano contains imported six-year-old Italian balsamic vinegar.
Black Pepper BellaVitano is hand-coated in premium coarse ground black pepper.
Merlot BellaVitano is immersed in Merlot wine.
Raspberry BellaVitano is immersed in a tart raspberry ale.
Chai BellaVitano is hand-coated with a blend of spices including black tea, ginger, cinnamon, cardamom and cloves.
Espresso BellaVitano is hand-coated with fresh ground Italian roast espresso beans.

Awards
BellaVitano Family Awards

References

American cheeses